Georg Gärtner (December 18, 1920 – January 30, 2013) was a German soldier who served during World War II and who was captured and held as a prisoner of war by the United States. He escaped from a prisoner of war camp, took on a new identity as Dennis F. Whiles, and was never recaptured. He revealed his true identity some 40 years later.

Biography
Gärtner was from Schweidnitz, Lower Silesia (now Świdnica, Poland). He enlisted in the Wehrmacht in 1940 
at age 19, and fought in the North African Campaign with the Afrika Korps. He was captured by British troops in Tunis in 1943 and was taken to the United States as a prisoner of war.

At the end of the war, Gärtner was terrified at the thought of being repatriated to his hometown, which at the time became a part of communist Poland, and decided to escape. Several weeks after the war's end, he escaped from his prison camp in Deming, New Mexico, on September 22, 1945. After crawling under two gates, he jumped aboard a passing freight train whose schedule he had calculated. The train took him to California.

Gärtner moved between various towns on the US West Coast, working as a lumberjack, dishwasher, or laborer. Having studied English as an officer candidate, he perfected his command of the language, created a new identity as Dennis F. Whiles, obtained a Social Security card in that name, and invented a biography in which he had been raised in an orphanage after his parents had been killed in a traffic accident. He eventually settled in Norden, California, where he worked as a ski instructor in the winter and in construction and sales jobs during the summer. While attending a YMCA dance, he met Jean Clarke, and the couple married in 1964. He adopted her two children from a previous marriage.

After his escape the US Army launched a manhunt which lasted until 1963. The FBI issued "wanted" posters for Gärtner in 1947. According to his autobiography, he joined a ski expedition formed to rescue the City of San Francisco, a train stranded in a blizzard in the Sierra Nevada in January 1952, immediately after which Life magazine took his and the group's picture. Meanwhile, FBI wanted posters for him were in most post offices. For 40 years Gärtner was listed as one of the FBI's most wanted persons. However, since the authorities correctly surmised his reason for escaping, to avoid repatriation rather than a violent goal such as seeking revenge for Germany's defeat, he was not designated "Dangerous," which would have resulted in a more intense manhunt.

Gärtner eventually moved to Boulder, Colorado, where he worked as a construction estimator and architectural consultant, and as retirement approached, relocated to Hawaii. Although he led a quiet life, his wife became increasingly frightened by his blatant refusal to discuss his past. In 1984, after she was about to leave him, he confessed his past to her. At her urging, he went public the following year. He contacted history professor Arnold Krammer, a well-known authority on the history of the 371,000 German POWs held in the United States during World War II. Together they published Hitler's Last Soldier in America (1985). He also appeared on the Today Show, where he "surrendered" to Bryant Gumbel. He effectively became the last World War II German prisoner of war in America.

When Gärtner went public, the government was bewildered about what to charge him with regarding his escape. Gärtner was not an illegal immigrant, since he had been brought to the United States against his will. He had not really escaped from prison since all German POWs were to be repatriated to their original homes, and Gärtner was due to be sent back to his hometown in Silesia, which had become a part of Communist Poland. Moreover, as he had escaped after the war had ended, there was some question of whether he was still a prisoner of war. Because of this, he was not charged with any offenses. The FBI announced that it had no further interest in him, and the Immigration and Naturalization Service confirmed it had no interest in deporting him. Gärtner was invited to become a U.S. citizen. Due to bureaucratic delays, it was not until November 2009 that he was finally naturalized as a citizen in South Denver.

His wife Jean Clarke divorced him in the 1980s, because he returned to Germany for two years with little communication. For a while he returned to Germany, as his sister lived in Hamburg, but he saw no future for himself in Germany, so he returned to Colorado after several months. He resided in Colorado for the remainder of his life, primarily living in the town of Gunbarrel, Colorado. He and Jean continued their friendship over the years and her grandchildren considered him a grandfather. In his later years he spent his time pursuing his passion as a painter and befriended other German speaking locals, often hosting German club at the bungalow he co-habited with an elderly German lady named Mildred.  

Gärtner died in Loveland, Colorado in 2013.

References

External links
1952 Life article on rescue of the City of San Francisco train, which Gärtner mentions in his book

1920 births
2013 deaths
People from Boulder, Colorado
People from Świdnica
German prisoners of war in World War II held by the United States
People from the Province of Lower Silesia
German emigrants to the United States
German escapees
Escapees from United States military detention